This article shows the rosters of the participating teams at the 1986 FIVB Volleyball Men's World Championship in France from 25 September - 5 October 1986.

Head coach: Marvin Dunphy

Head coach: Gennadiy Parshin

Head coach: Bogdan Kyuchukov

Head coach: Jose Carlos Brunoro



Coach Éric Daniel



Head coach: K. Láznička, M. Nekola





Head coach: Silvano Prandi











References

External links
Results and teams

1986 in volleyball
FIVB Volleyball Men's World Championship squads